The exploration of North America by European sailors and geographers was an effort by major European powers to map and explore the continent with the goal of economic, religious and military expansion. The combative and rapid nature of this exploration is the result of a series of countering actions by neighboring European nations to ensure no single country had garnered enough wealth and power from the Americas to militarily tip the scales over on the European continent. It spanned the late 15th to early 17th centuries, and consisted primarily of expeditions funded by Spain, England, France, and Portugal. See also the European colonization of the Americas.

Pre-Columbian exploration

According to the Sagas of Icelanders, Norse sailors (often called Vikings) from Iceland first settled Greenland in the 980s. Erik the Red explored and settled southwestern Greenland, which he named to entice potential Icelandic settlers, eventually establishing the Eastern and Western Settlements, which were abandoned around 1350.

L'Anse aux Meadows, an archaeological site on the northernmost tip of Newfoundland, and a second site in southwestern Newfoundland, are the only known sites of a Norse village in North America outside of Greenland. These sites are notable for their possible connections with the attempted colony of Vinland established by Leif Erikson in 1003.

Age of Discovery and the search for the Northwest Passage

The Viking voyages did not become common knowledge in the Old World, and Europeans remained unaware of the existence of the Americas as a whole, until the first decades following the year 1492. Many expeditions were launched from European nations in search of a Northwest Passage to East Asia (or "the Indies" as the region was called) in order to establish a shorter trade route to China than the Silk Road, a trade route which had become desperately needed and yet exacerbated by the fall of Constantinople. Also, the Castilian crown needed an alternative to the Portuguese controlled eastern maritime trade route around Africa to India and East Asia.

On August 3, 1492, the Italian navigator Christopher Columbus set sail from the Port of Palos de la Frontera in the Province of Huelva, from the newly los Reyes Católicos coordinated Kingdoms of Castile and Aragon, in present-day Spain, financed by Queen Isabella I of Castille. Columbus's Letter on the First Voyage of his discovery of the Bahamas, Cuba, and Hispaniola spread the news across Europe quickly. Columbus rediscovered and explored much of the Lesser Antilles in his second voyage then discovered both Trinidad and Tobago on his third voyage whilst skirting the northern South American coast. His fourth voyage was spent scanning the Central American coast. The voyages of Christopher Columbus opened the New World.

Italian navigator and explorer Giovanni Caboto (known in English as John Cabot) is credited with the discovery of continental North America on June 24, 1497, under the commission of Henry VII of England. Though the exact location of his discovery remains disputed, the Canadian and United Kingdom governments' official position is that he landed on the island of Newfoundland. The English presence through Giovanni Caboto was signaled in Juan de la Cosa's map of 1500.

In 1499 João Fernandes Lavrador was licensed by the King of Manuel I of Portugal and together with Pêro de Barcelos they reached Greenland and sighted Labrador for the first time since Leif Erikson, which was granted and named after Lavrador. After returning he possibly went to Bristol to sail in the name of England. Nearly at the same time, between 1499 and 1502 the brothers Gaspar and Miguel Corte Real explored and named the coasts of Greenland, Labrador and also Newfoundland, naming "Terra Verde" the explored North American coasts. Both explorations were signaled in 1502 Cantino planisphere.

It was soon understood that Columbus had not reached Asia, but rather found what was to Europeans a New World, which in 1507 was named "America", after Amerigo Vespucci, on the Waldseemüller map.

Further nautical explorations
In 1500, Pedro Álvares Cabral was sent by Portugal to explore South America. He is considered to be the discoverer of Brazil.

King Ferdinand II of Aragon sent Juan Ponce de León from the fledgling colony on Hispaniola to verify rumors of undiscovered land to the northwest. On April 2, 1513, Ponce de León disembarked on the northeast coast of what he named Florida for the crown. The exact location is disputed, but historians have offered the possibilities of St. Augustine, Ponce de León Inlet, and Melbourne Beach. He encountered the powerful Gulf Stream, and found a passage through the Florida Keys to land on the southwestern coast of Florida on the Gulf of Mexico. Again, the exact location is disputed. While it is true that Columbus visited Puerto Rico and the Virgin Islands in 1493, Ponce de Leon was the first known European to reach the present-day United States mainland.

On September 25, 1513, Spanish  Vasco Núñez de Balboa was the first European to see the Pacific Ocean once he crossed the Isthmus of Panama.

Around 1519–1521, with a mission to establish colonies for Portugal, João Álvares Fagundes explored the coasts of Newfoundland, Labrador, and Nova Scotia.

In 1521, Juan Ponce de León attempted to establish a permanent settlement on the west coast of Florida. The landing place has not been determined. His expedition was repulsed by natives. Ponce de León was struck by an arrow, and died of his wounds.

In 1524, Italian explorer Giovanni da Verrazzano sailed for King Francis I of France, and is known as the first European since the Norse to explore the Atlantic coast of North America. Arriving near the Cape Fear River delta, he explored the coastlines of present-day states of North and  South Carolina, entering the Pamlico Sound, and bypassing entrances to the Chesapeake Bay. Believing the New York Harbor to be a lake, he sailed past Long Island, exploring Narragansett Bay and Newfoundland.

In 1524–1525, Portuguese explorer Estevão Gomes, on behalf of Charles I of Spain, explored present-day Nova Scotia sailing South along the Maine coast. Gomes entered New York Harbor and saw the Hudson River (which he named the "San Antonio River"). Because of his expedition, the 1529 Diogo Ribeiro world map outlines the East coast of North America almost perfectly.

In 1528, Pánfilo de Narváez, who had been named adelantado (governor) of La Florida by Carlos I, the King of Spain, landed in Boca Ciega Bay on the west coast of Florida to begin the ill-fated land expedition of 300 men, of which only four survived. One survivor, Álvar Núñez Cabeza de Vaca, wrote the Relación, his book of the eight-year survival journey, on his return to Spain.

In 1534, Jacques Cartier planted a cross in the Gaspé Peninsula on the Gulf of Saint Lawrence and claimed the land in the name of Francis I. In 1535 Cartier explored the St. Lawrence river and also claimed the region for France.

In 1539 Hernando De Soto leads the first European expedition deep into the territory of the modern-day United States (through Florida, Georgia, Alabama, Mississippi, and most likely Arkansas)

After two failed attempts to reach East Asia by circumnavigating Siberia, Henry Hudson sailed west in 1609 under the Dutch East India Company. He, too, passed Cape Cod, Chesapeake Bay and the Delaware Bay, instead sailing up the Hudson River on September 11, 1609 in search of a fabled connection to the Pacific via what was actually the Great Lakes. In Hudson's fourth and final voyage, he discovered, mapped, and explored the Hudson Strait, Hudson Bay and James Bay.

Other major sea-based explorers were Captain James Cook, George Vancouver, and Charles Wilkes.

Overland exploration of the West

16th to 17th centuries

There were numerous Spanish explorers and conquistadors who explored the Southwest of North America (including present-day west and central United States) and cross the continent (east to west) in its southern regions, mainly from the second quarter to the middle of the 16th century, such as Álvar Núñez Cabeza de Vaca and Francisco Vásquez de Coronado, but also the North American Southeast and south-central regions.
While Spain's Juan Rodríguez Cabrillo laid claim to the Pacific Coast of California in the mid 1500s, the earliest land expedition by the Portolà expedition two hundred years later established Catholic missions from Spanish-controlled Baja California northward.

In 1608 Samuel de Champlain founded what is now Quebec City, which would become the first permanent settlement and the capital of New France. He took personal administration over the city and its affairs, and sent out expeditions to explore the interior. Champlain himself discovered Lake Champlain in 1609. By 1615, he had travelled by canoe up the Ottawa River through Lake Nipissing and Georgian Bay to the centre of Huron country near Lake Simcoe. During these voyages, Champlain aided the Wendat (aka 'Hurons') in their battles against the Iroquois Confederacy. As a result, the Iroquois would become enemies of the French and be involved in multiple conflicts.

From 1679 to 1682 René-Robert Cavelier, Sieur de La Salle explored the Great Lakes region of the United States and Canada, and the entire course of Mississippi River to the Gulf of Mexico.

From 1697 to 1702 Eusebio Kino explored the Sonoran Desert and on his journey to the Colorado River Delta discovered an overland route to Baja California that was then commonly believed to be an island. In 1683 Kino lead the first European overland crossing of Baja California.

European exploration of western Canada was largely motivated by the fur trade and the search for the elusive Northwest Passage. Hudson's Bay Company explorer Henry Kelsey has the distinction of being the first European to see the northern Great Plains in 1690.

18th century

Anthony Henday was the first to have seen the Rocky Mountains, in 1754, but curiously did not mention it in his journals. From his westernmost geographic position (roughly near the town of Olds, Alberta, halfway between Calgary and Red Deer, Alberta) the Rockies should have been quite conspicuous, but he was likely trying to disguise the disappointing fact that an unknown range of seemingly impassible mountains now stood between the Hudson's Bay Company and the Pacific. Samuel Hearne found the Coppermine River in 1769–71 in his failed search for copper ore deposits. Disillusioned by these shortfalls, the HBC largely quit exploration.

The North West Company, on the other hand, used a business model that required constant expansion into untapped areas. Under the auspices of the NWC, Alexander Mackenzie discovered the Mackenzie River in 1789 and was the first European to reach the North-American Pacific overland, via the Bella Coola River, in 1793. Simon Fraser reached the Pacific in 1808 via the Fraser River.

David Thompson, widely regarded as the greatest land geographer that ever lived, traveled over 90,000 km during his lifetime. In 1797, Thompson was sent south by his employers to survey part of the Canada-U.S. boundary along the water routes from Lake Superior to Lake of the Woods to satisfy unresolved questions of territory arising from the Jay Treaty between Great Britain and the United States. In 1798, the company sent him to Red Deer Lake (in present-day Alberta) to establish a trading post. The English translation of Lac La Biche-Red Deer Lake-first appeared on the Mackenzie map of 1793. Thompson spent the next few seasons trading based in Fort George (now in Alberta), and during this time led several expeditions into the Rocky Mountains. In 1811/1812 he followed the Columbia River to the Pacific, and in 1814 used his notes and measurements to draft the first European-style map of western Canada, covering 3.9 million square kilometres.

19th century to present
Lewis and Clark were the first Americans to venture into the newly acquired territory of the Louisiana Purchase, at the order of President Thomas Jefferson. They discovered many new geographical features, Indian tribes, and animal and plant species. John Colter was a member of the expedition who subsequently became a guide for others in the 'Old West,' and did some explorations of his own.

John C. Frémont led many important explorations in the Great Plains, Great Basin, Oregon territory, and Mexican Alta California.

Joseph Reddeford Walker was one of the most prominent of the explorers, and charted many new paths through the West, which often were then utilized by emigrants crossing to settle in Western towns and communities. In 1833, his exploring party discovered a route along the Humboldt River across present-day Nevada, ascending the Sierra Nevada following the Carson River and descending via Stanislaus River drainages to Monterey. His return route across the southern Sierra was via Walker Pass, named after Walker by John Charles Fremont. The approach of the Sierra via the Carson River route later became known as the California Trail, the primary route for the emigrants to the gold fields during the California gold rush.

As the American population of the West increased, the US government launched ongoing official explorations mainly through the US Army Corps of Topographical Engineers. One of the main officers and explorers in this unit was George Wheeler. In 1872, the US Congress authorized an ambitious plan to map the portion of the United States west of the 100th meridian at a scale of 8 miles to the inch. This plan necessitated what became known as the Wheeler Survey, along with the Clarence King and John Wesley Powell Surveys, and expeditions by Ferdinand Vandeveer Hayden. In 1879, all such efforts were reorganized as the United States Geological Survey.

Gallery

See also

Historical overviews
 16th century in North American history
 Age of Discovery
 Notable cartographers of the Age of Exploration
 National Historic Trail
 Americas (terminology)
 European colonization of the Americas
 Voyages of Christopher Columbus

Specific eras, explorers, regions, and efforts
 Old West + Mountain men
 Amerigo Vespucci, Martin Waldseemüller + Matthias Ringmann: originators of term America

References

 Ambrose, Stephen E.Undaunted Courage: Meriwether Lewis, Thomas Jefferson, and the Opening of the American West, New York: Simon & Schuster (1996). 
 Bartlett, Richard. Great Surveys of the American West. Norman: University of Oklahoma Press, 1980.
 Fernlund, Kevin J.William Henry Holmes and the Rediscovery of the American West. Albuquerque: University of New Mexico Press, 2000. 
 Goetzmann, William H. Exploration and Empire: The Explorer and the Scientist in the Winning of the American West. New York: Alfred A. Knopf, 1966.
 Maura, Juan Francisco. Españoles y portugueses en Canadá en tiempos de Cristóbal Colón. Colección Parnase-Lemir, Valencia: Universidad de Valencia, 2021. http://parnaseo.uv.es/Lemir/Textos/Juan_Maura_Lemir.pdf
 Pyne, Stephen J. Grove Karl Gilbert: A Great Engine of Research. Austin: University of Texas Press, 1980.
 Stegner, Wallace. Beyond the Hundredth Meridian: John Wesley Powell and the Second Opening of the West. Houghton, Mifflin, 1954.

External links
 National Park Service links and materials on explorers of North America
 Historical Maps and Prints - A diverse collection (1503-1910) from the UBC Library Digital Collections that pertains to the exploration and mapping of the world, the evolution of cartography, and the settlement of North America
 Early Maps of Florida at A History of Central Florida Podcast

 
+
+
+
History of geography
Maritime history